Aubrey Eric Stacy Aumonier (5 May 1899 – 1974), was a British sculptor.

Life
Aumonier was born in Northwood, Middlesex (now northwest London); his family name is Huguenot (French Protestant). Eric's grandfather, William, founded the Aumonier Studios in 1876, an architectural sculpture firm in London, initially located at New Inn Yard off Tottenham Court Road, then at 84 Charlotte Street. His son, also called William, continued the firm into the 1930s. William (junior) studied at the West London School of Art. He exhibited at the Royal Academy of Art in 1899–1900 and was responsible for the architectural decorations of the Victoria Law Courts, Birmingham, in the late 1880s.

Two of his sons, Whitworth and Eric himself, were sculptors. Eric studied at the Slade School of Art. By 1931, Eric and Whitworth were running the studio as W. Aumonier & Sons, with Eric responsible for artistic output.

In 1929, Aumonier was commissioned with five others to carve one of a set of relief sculptures of the four winds for 55 Broadway, the new Underground Electric Railways Company of London headquarters in St. James's, London, designed by Charles Holden. Aumonier carved the South Wind on the west side of the North wing (not visible from ground level).

In 1932, Aumonier designed two Art Deco relief sculptures in the foyer of the Daily Express Building in London. He also designed a young horse, in white porcelain, for Royal Worcester.

Another commission for London Underground, The Archer at East Finchley Underground station, is his most iconic work, the only three-dimensional statue on the system. The contract for the work was placed on 8 June 1939, with an estimated cost of £245. The architect for the station was once again Charles Holden. The sculpture was unveiled on 22 July 1940.

Pennyfare, London Transport's staff journal, explained the roots of the image in July 1940:
"the figure of an ancient hunter of wild game is placed high up on the new East Finchley station. It is more than a decorative device – it is powerful symbolism".

Finchley was on the edge of the royal forest of Enfield, which was hunted by both court and commoner. Drivers on the Northern line still bear a tie pin based on the sculpture.

The Archer is nearly twice natural size and was made of six hundredweight of beech timber round a steel armature and then covered with 5 hundredweight of sheet lead. The timber had come from Czechoslovakia. The gold for the gilded features was mined in South Africa and the bow was English ash, bent by steam and coated with copper and gilt. The sculpture was probably constructed in three main sections, which were re-assembled on site.

Amongst other work for London Underground, Aumonier also made two stone reliefs over two of the entrances to the canteen at London Underground's Acton Works – one of a pie, knife and fork. A sculpture of Dick Whittington was planned for Highgate, but a reduction in the scope of the new station buildings caused by World War II meant this was never commissioned.

Aumonier worked on the new City Hall in Norwich with Alfred Hardiman and James Woodford.

The sculptor also did some set work in the cinema. In 1946 he worked on the Powell and Pressburger film A Matter of Life and Death at Denham Film Studios. On the giant moving stairway featured in the film, Aumonier created the statues of various famous people. By coincidence, Powell and Pressburger's production company was called The Archers.

In later years, Aumonier and his wife moved to Ashburton, New Zealand, where he died in 1974.

References

McGill, Ann. The Aumoniers, Craftsmen and Artists New York : Highland Books.

External links
The Archer as recorded on the Big Art Map.
London Transport Museum Photographic Archive

Proposed station building at Highgate showing proposed Dick Whittington statue

1899 births
1974 deaths
British architectural sculptors
People associated with transport in London
People from Northwood, London
People from Ashburton, New Zealand
20th-century British sculptors
British male sculptors
20th-century British male artists